Count Alexander Nikolayevich Liders (tr. ; 14 January 1790 – 2 February 1874), better known as Alexander von Lüders, was a Russian general and Namestnik of the Kingdom of Poland of German extraction.

Lüders was born to a German noble family that moved to Russia in the middle of the 18th century. His father, Major General Nikolay Ivanovich von Lüders (1762–1823) was the commander of Bryansk regiment during the Napoleonic Wars.

Count Lüders also participated in the Napoleonic Wars and was heavily wounded in the Battle of Kulm (1813). He was distinguished during the Russo-Turkish War (1828–1829). A member of the Russian army during the November Uprising, he participated in the Battle of Warsaw in 1831, leading the troops that captured Wola.

In 1837 he became the commander of the 5th Infantry Corps of Russian Army. In 1843 he and his Corps took part in quelling another uprising against the Russian Empire, that of Imam Shamil during the Caucasian War. In 1848 he commanded Russian troops in Moldova and Walachia. In 1849 he commanded the 5th Corps sent to aid Austria during the Hungarian Revolution of 1848. In 1849 he defeated Polish-Hungarian forces under general Józef Bem at the Battle of Segesvár. During the Crimean War (1854 –1856) he commanded the Army South operating in the middle Danube region.

From November 1861 to June 1862 he held the position of Namestnik of the Kingdom of Poland; he is remembered as a brutal overseer, persecuting Poles and the Catholic Church. His activities contributed to the rising tensions that culminated in the January Uprising (1863), however Lüders had already been wounded in 1862 during an assassination attempt by the Ukrainian officer Andrij Potebnia (a member of the Committee of Russian Officers in Poland, who took revenge on Lüders for executing his revolutionary comrades) and returned to St. Petersburg before the uprising, to become one of the members of State Council of Imperial Russia. After promotion to the State Council the family of Lüders got the count title. Since Lüders did not have sons the title Count Lüders was given to the husband of Lüders' daughter, Alexander Weimarn and their offspring

References

1790 births
1874 deaths
Hungarian Revolution of 1848
People of the Revolutions of 1848
Namestniks of the Kingdom of Poland
Members of the State Council (Russian Empire)
Russian people of the November Uprising
Recipients of the Order of St. George of the Second Degree
Knights Commander of the Military Order of William
Commanders Cross of the Military Order of Maria Theresa
Recipients of the Order of the White Eagle (Russia)